Enskededalen is a district in Skarpnäck borough, Stockholm, Sweden. Enskededalen has 2,253 inhabitants as of December 31, 2007.

Enskededalen consists mostly of detached housing which were built as a garden city in the 1920s.

References

Districts of Stockholm